Christopher Naylor may refer to:
 Christopher Naylor (actor), British actor
 Christopher Naylor (chef) (born 1970), British Michelin starred head chef
 Christopher David Naylor (born 1954), Canadian physician